Sinden may refer to:

Sinden (surname)
Sinden (DJ), British DJ, remixer and record producer Graeme Sinden
The Count & Sinden, his collaboration with Joshua "Hervé" Harvey (The Count)
10369 Sinden, main-belt asteroid
Pesindhèn, Javanese female solo singer

See also 
Sindon (disambiguation)